Tarsiphantes is a monotypic genus of sheet weavers containing the single species, Tarsiphantes latithorax. It was first described by Embrik Strand in 1905, and has only been found in Europe, Canada, Russia, on the Greenland, and in Siberia.

See also
 List of Linyphiidae species (Q–Z)

References

Linyphiidae
Monotypic Araneomorphae genera
Spiders of North America
Spiders of Russia
Taxa named by Embrik Strand